A normal route or normal way is the most frequently used route for ascending and descending a mountain peak. It is usually the simplest route.

Overview
In the Alps, routes are classed in the following ways, based on their waymarking, construction and upkeep:
Footpaths (Fußwege)
Hiking trails (Wanderwege)
Mountain trails (Bergwege)
Alpine routes (Alpine Routen)
Climbing routes (Kletterrouten) and High Alpine routes (Hochalpine Routen) in combined rock and ice terrain, (UIAA) graded by difficulty

Sometimes the normal route is not the easiest ascent to the summit, but just the one that is most used. There may be technically easier variations. This is especially the case on the Watzmannfrau, the Hochkalter and also Mount Everest. There may be many reasons these easier options are less well-used:
 the simplest route is less well known than the normal route (Watzmannfrau).
 the technically easiest route is more arduous than another (e.g. due to rubble) and is therefore mainly used on the descent (Hochkalter).
 the technically easiest route carries a much higher risk of e.g. rockfalls or avalanche and is therefore avoided in favour of a more difficult route (Watzespitze).
 the technically easier route requires a complicated or long approach march, or all access may be banned via one country (Mount Everest).

The term tourist route may sometimes be applied (irrespective of the level of difficulty of ascent) by those wishing to suggest that other routes up a mountain are somehow more "worthy". This belittling of the "normal route" therefore maintains a distinction between those perceiving themselves as serious mountaineers who disparage the incursion of tourist climbers into their domain (hence the term the "Yak Route" on Mount Everest).

References 

Hiking
Climbing